Florencia Molinero (born 28 November 1988) is an Argentine former professional tennis player. She was coached by Leonardo Alonso.

Her highest WTA singles ranking is 170, which she reached on 2 April 2012. Her career-high in doubles is 105, achieved on 15 September 2014.

Playing for Argentina Fed Cup team, Molinero has a win–loss record of 11–4.

WTA 125 tournament finals

Doubles: 1 (runner-up)

ITF Circuit finals

Singles: 23 (9 titles, 14 runner-ups)

Doubles: 51 (25 titles, 26 runner-ups)

External links
 
 

1988 births
Living people
Argentine female tennis players
People from Rafaela
Tennis players at the 2011 Pan American Games
Pan American Games gold medalists for Argentina
Pan American Games medalists in tennis
Medalists at the 2011 Pan American Games
Sportspeople from Santa Fe Province
21st-century Argentine women